The Sono arsenic filter was invented in 2006 by Abul Hussam, who is a chemistry professor at George Mason University (GMU) in Fairfax, Virginia. It was developed to deal with the problem of arsenic contamination of groundwater. The filter is now in use in Hussam's native Bangladesh.

Development
Farmers had been drinking fresh groundwater from wells, whereas previously they had had to use ponds and mudholes which were contaminated with bacteria and viruses. However, these wells were also contaminated with naturally occurring high concentrations of poisonous arsenic, causing skin ailments and cancers. Awareness of the problem developed through the 1990s.

Allan Smith, an epidemiologist at the University of California at Berkeley, observed that the arsenic problem affects millions of people worldwide:

Hussam developed his filter after years of testing hundreds of prototypes. The final version contains 20 pounds of shards of porous iron, which bonds chemically with arsenic. It also includes charcoal, sand and bits of brick. It filters nearly all arsenic from well water.

Awards
Hussam was awarded the 2007 Grainger challenge Prize for Sustainability by the National Academy of Engineering. Hussam plans to use 70% of the $1 million engineering prize to distribute filters to needy communities.

See also
 Backwashing
 Bangladesh
 Carbon filtering
 Distillation
 Filtration
 Reverse osmosis
 Sand separator
 Settling basin
 Water purification

References

External links 
 DWC-Water: Arsenic filtration - description and test results.
 Invention description at GMU website
 Manob Sakti Unnayan Kendro (MSUK) - development and distribution.

Bangladeshi inventions
Water filters
Arsenic
Water pollution